Lyubov Aleksandrovna Bruletova (born September 17, 1973) is a Russian judoka. Now she is judoka coach.

She won a silver medal in the extra-lightweight (-48 kg) division at the 2000 Summer Olympics.

External links

 
 
 

1973 births
Living people
Sportspeople from Ivanovo
Russian female judoka
Judoka at the 2000 Summer Olympics
Judoka at the 2004 Summer Olympics
Olympic judoka of Russia
Olympic silver medalists for Russia
Olympic medalists in judo
Medalists at the 2000 Summer Olympics
Universiade medalists in judo
Universiade bronze medalists for Russia